Sinosia is a monotypic moth genus of the family Erebidae. Its only species, Sinosia inornata, is found in French Guiana. Both the genus and species were first described by Schaus in 1914.

References

Calpinae
Monotypic moth genera